Justice Dr. Jane Mayemu Ansah, S.C. (born 11 October 1955) is the former chairperson of the Malawi Electoral Commission. She is also a former Malawian Supreme Court Judge and was the first female Attorney General in Malawi. She is most known for her role as the head of the Malawi's Electoral Commission during the 2019 general elections. Her role in this position sparked national protests both in support and in opposition to her role due to election irregularities resulting in protestors calling for her resignation. In July 2020, she left Malawi for UK.

Career

She served as a High Court judge from December 1998. She then served as Attorney General of Malawi from 2006 to 2011. She was appointed as the Supreme Court of Appeals judge in 2011. Ansah was appointed to Chairperson of the Malawi Electoral Commission in October 2016 succeeding Justice Maxon Mbendera.

2019 Malawi elections

She was accused of mismanaging the 2019 Malawian general election which led to the Jane Ansah Must Fall campaign in which nation-wide anti-Jane Ansah protests calling for her resignation occurred in June and July 2019. A group of women (pro-Jane Ansah camp), led by Seodi White and Minister of Gender Mary Navicha argued that Ansah was a victim of sexism and gender discrimination. They staged a counter protests that were in solidarity of Jane Ansah and her role in the elections. Thousands of women marched in defense of her role in the elections, many wearing shirts written "I am Jane Ansah".. Both the High Court of Malawi (sitting as a Constitutional Court) and the Supreme Court of Malawi in their respective rulings which nullified the elections, found the electoral commission under her leadership incompetent and negligent.

Calls for Jane Ansah were intensified  by the wave of demonstrations that were led by Civil society group Human Rights Defenders Coalition (HRDC) that was led by Timothy Mtambo, Gift Trapence, Billy Mayaya, Luke Tembo, Mcdonald Sembereka and Others. Other groups also demanded that Ansah resign , with Malawi Congress Party Diaspora Network Chairperson Chalo Mvula also adding calls Ansah to go.

Resignation

On 21 May 2020, Ansah announced her resignation as chairperson of the Malawi Electoral Commission after two successive court rulings confirmed massive irregularities in the 2019 elections. Consequently the courts ordered that fresh presidential elections be held. On 22 May 2020 President Arthur Peter Mutharika accepted her resignation. On 7 June 2020, President Mutharika appointed Justice Dr. Chifundo Kachale as the new MEC chairperson replacing Judge Ansah.

References

Living people
1955 births
20th-century Malawian judges
21st-century Malawian judges
Malawian women lawyers
Attorneys-General of Malawi